The following highways are numbered 718:

Costa Rica
 National Route 718

United States